André Becker (born 26 July 1996) is a Brazilian professional footballer who plays as a forward for  club Viktoria Köln.

Career
Becker made his professional debut for Jahn Regensburg in the 2020–21 DFB-Pokal on 13 September 2020, coming on as a substitute in the 86th minute in the home match against 3. Liga side 1. FC Kaiserslautern.

He was loaned to Würzburger Kickers in January 2022.

On 12 June 2022, Becker signed with Viktoria Köln.

References

External links
 
 
 
 

1996 births
Living people
German footballers
Brazilian footballers
German people of Brazilian descent
Association football forwards
FC Astoria Walldorf players
SSV Jahn Regensburg players
Würzburger Kickers players
FC Viktoria Köln players
2. Bundesliga players
Regionalliga players
3. Liga players
Sportspeople from Recife